Elk Mills is an unincorporated community in Cecil County, Maryland, United States. Elk Mills is located on Maryland Route 277 at the crossing of CSX's Philadelphia Subdivision railroad line north of Elkton.

References

Unincorporated communities in Cecil County, Maryland
Unincorporated communities in Maryland